Sergey Vladimirovich Lyakhov (born March 1, 1968) is a retired discus thrower and shot putter from Russia, who represented his native country at the 1996 Summer Olympics. His personal bests are 19.52 metres in the shot put (Moscow, 1999-06-17), and 66.78 metres in the discus throw (Monaco, 1995-09-09). He is a two-time Russian national champion in the discus event.

International competitions

References

1968 births
Living people
Soviet male discus throwers
Soviet male shot putters
Russian male discus throwers
Russian male shot putters
Olympic male shot putters
Olympic athletes of Russia
Athletes (track and field) at the 1996 Summer Olympics
Goodwill Games medalists in athletics
Competitors at the 1994 Goodwill Games
World Athletics Championships athletes for the Soviet Union
World Athletics Championships athletes for Russia
Russian Athletics Championships winners
New Zealand Athletics Championships winners